Yeşilova is a town in Burdur Province in the Mediterranean region of Turkey. It is the seat of Yeşilova District. Its population is 5,451 (2021).

References

Populated places in Burdur Province
Towns in Turkey
Yeşilova District